Senna Lodigiana is a comune (municipality) in the Province of Lodi in the Italian region Lombardy, located about  southeast of Milan and about  southeast of Lodi.

Passum Padi, the place where Via Francigena  cross the Po River, is included in the communal territory.

References

External links
 Official website

Cities and towns in Lombardy